Isoplenodia arrogans is a moth of the  family Geometridae. It is found on Madagascar.

The male of this species has a wingspan of 18-19mm, the female of 23mm. Males & females have pectinated antennaes.

References

Scopulini
Moths described in 1932
Moths of Madagascar
Moths of Africa